Herbert Cartwright (1916 – after 1937) was an English professional footballer who played in the Football League for Mansfield Town.

References

1916 births
English footballers
Association football forwards
English Football League players
Rotherham United F.C. players
Mansfield Town F.C. players
Year of death missing